There are over 20,000 Grade II* listed buildings in England. This page is a list of these buildings in the unitary authority of Southend-on-Sea in Essex.

Southend-on-Sea

|}

Notes

External links

 
Lists of Grade II* listed buildings in Essex
Southend-on-Sea (district)